The Princess Diaries Volume V: Princess in Pink, released in the United Kingdom as The Princess Diaries: Give Me Five, is a young adult book in the Princess Diaries series.  Written by Meg Cabot, it was released in 2004 by Harper Collins Publishers and is the fifth book in the series.

Plot Summary 

Mia Thermopolis' boyfriend won't take her to the prom. 
  Her 15th birthday is coming soon, and friends convince her that he'll ask on that day. 
 Michael and his band sing a song for her on her birthday. The volume was up so that everyone in the school heard. 
Michael earns detention but still manages to make it in time for Mia's birthday dinner. 
Mia was surprised by her birthday gifts,  especially a snowflake necklace from Michael that symbolizes their falling in love at the winter dance. 
Dinner turns into a disaster.   Poodle jumps out of Grand-mère's purse and runs around the restaurant. The busboy (Jangbu) spills a meal on Grand-mère's suit and gets fired. 
Mia throws a birthday party. While parents are getting more birthday supplies, teens play a game of Seven Minutes in Heaven. Mia asks Michael to prom, but he refuses her by saying he'll go bowling instead.  
 Instead of taking her boyfriend Boris into the closet with her, Lilly enters with the handsome Jangbu.  Boris breaks down.  
Mia's parents return home and stop the party.
At school, Boris tells Lilly that he loves her so much he'll drop a globe on his head if she doesn't take him back. Lilly refuses him, and he accidentally does so and injures his skull. Mia and Michael stop him from severely bleeding. 
Tina comforts Boris,  and they become a couple.
Later on, all the busboys in town go on protest after the incident at the restaurant. The protest ruins the venue for the senior prom. Grand-mère helps and provides a new location, the Empire State Building.
Mia blackmails Lana into letting Michael's band play at the prom, which they do.
 Michael and Mia reach second base at the prom, and Mia's mother gives birth to Rocky Thermopolis-Gianini.
Jangbu, the busboy, returns to his home country,  leaving Lilly to contemplate her decision to leave Boris and his newfound love for Tina.

2004 American novels
American young adult novels

The Princess Diaries novels
HarperCollins books
Proms in fiction